The 2021–22 UAE President's Cup was the 45th edition of the UAE President's Cup, Shabab Al Ahli were the defending champions after winning the last season's President's Cup, but were knocked out in the quarter-finals by eventual champions Sharjah.

Participating clubs

Draw dates

Preliminary round
The preliminary round is contested between the 16 teams in the UAE First Division League, divided into four groups of four, the winners of each group will advance into a play off round.

Group stage

Group A

Group B

Group C

Group D

Play off round

Knockout stage

Bracket

Round of 16
All times are local (UTC+04:00)

Quarter-finals

Semi-finals

First leg

Second leg

Final

Top Scorers

 Note: Goals scored in the preliminary round are not included.

References

UAE President's Cup seasons
President's Cup
2021–22 Asian domestic association football cups